Federico Bernal Frausto (born 31 October 1953) is a Mexican politician from the National Action Party. In 2009 he served as Deputy of the LX Legislature of the Mexican Congress representing Zacatecas, after having served in the Congress of Zacatecas.

See also 
 1998, Zacatecas state election

References

1953 births
Living people
Politicians from Zacatecas
National Action Party (Mexico) politicians
21st-century Mexican politicians
20th-century Mexican politicians
Municipal presidents in Zacatecas
Members of the Congress of Zacatecas
Deputies of the LX Legislature of Mexico
Members of the Chamber of Deputies (Mexico) for Zacatecas